Valencina de la Concepción is a town located in the province of Seville, Andalusia, Spain. It has a population of 7,800 as of 2018.

Romería de Torrijos festival 
On the second Sunday of October there is a public holiday in the town, called "Romería de Torrijos". In 1923 the decision was taken to establish a pilgrimage to the sanctuary of Torrijos on the second Sunday of October, carrying in procession the image of the patroness. The Virgin is accompanied by numerous pilgrims in decorated carriages or on horseback. When the Virgin arrives at the Torrijos Hacienda, mass is celebrated in the central courtyard. Is is a major pilgrimage of the  comarca.

Prehistory 

The town has a big Chalcolithic deposit, one of the biggest of Spain. In Valencina there are two very famous dolmens, the dolmen of Matarrubilla and the Dolmen de la Pastora. A dolmen is a megalithic tomb with several upright stones supporting a flat table or capstone. Many date back to pre 3000 BC. Originally the dolmens were covered with earth to form a barrow, but time has eroded everything leaving just the stones intact.

Archaeological remains from 2500 BC indicate it was a major copper-smelting town.

References

External links

City Hall of Valencina - Official site of the City Hall of Valencina de la Concepción
Valencina de la Concepción - Sistema de Información Multiterritorial de Andalucía
Urbanismo en Valencina - Information about town planning in Valencina de la Concepción
Dolmen of Matarrubilla - Information about the dolmen of Matarrubilla
Dolmen of La Pastora - Information about the dolmen of La Pastora

Municipalities of the Province of Seville